Rusulaid is an Estonian island in the Baltic Sea. This island is referenced a book titled Islands of Estonia.

See also
 List of islands of Estonia

  

Estonian islands in the Baltic
Saaremaa Parish